Albert Henry Bosch (October 30, 1908 – November 21, 2005) was an American jurist and politician who served as a Republican member of the United States House of Representatives from New York from 1953 to 1960. From 1962 to 1974 he served on the New York Supreme Court.

Early life and education
Bosch was born in New York City the son of Henry and Margaretha (Hamburger) Bosch. He attended the public schools and graduated with an LL.B from St. John's University School of Law in 1933. He married Theresa Hoenig on July 19, 1936, was admitted to the bar in 1938, and commenced the practice of law in New York City.

Bosch was admitted to practice before the Treasury Department and the Supreme Court of the United States, and became trustee of Hamburg Savings Bank, Ridgewood, New York.

Tenure
Elected as a Republican to the Eighty-third Congress in 1952, and reelected to the three succeeding Congresses, Bosch served from January 3, 1953, until his resignation on December 31, 1960. Bosch voted in favor of the Civil Rights Acts of 1957 and 1960.

Judicial career
Bosch was elected judge of Queens County court and served from December 31, 1960, until September 1, 1962. He was elected justice of the New York Supreme Court, eleventh judicial district, and served from 1962 until his retirement on December 31, 1974.

Retirement and death
Bosch lived for nearly 30 years after retiring from the Court. A German-American, he was active in the Steuben Society, including serving as the group's national chairman on two occasions. He also was a member of the Bushwick Club business association, among other service groups to which he belonged.

After living in Jamaica Estates in the early 1970s, he moved with his wife to Whiting, New Jersey in 1976. Following his wife's death in 1995, he moved to Amityville, Suffolk County, Long Island, New York. He died there on November 21, 2005 (age 97 years, 22 days). He is interred at Maple Grove Cemetery.

References

External links

1908 births
2005 deaths
New York (state) lawyers
New York Supreme Court Justices
Politicians from New York City
St. John's University School of Law alumni
Republican Party members of the United States House of Representatives from New York (state)
20th-century American politicians
20th-century American judges
20th-century American lawyers